Thelma Jean Grossholtz (April 17, 1929 – February 9, 2021) was an American professor emeritus of politics and women's studies at Mount Holyoke College in South Hadley, Massachusetts. Beyond her academic work she was also known as an activist for peace and against forced prostitution, and as a senior bodybuilder.

Academic career
After completing undergraduate work at Pennsylvania State University in 1956, Grossholtz earned a master's degree at the University of Denver in 1957, with a master's thesis on Germany–Spain relations in World War II. Grossholtz went on to earn a Doctor of Philosophy from the Massachusetts Institute of Technology in 1961, where she trained as a specialist in South East Asian Politics. At Mount Holyoke, she became a founder of the women's studies program. She retired in 1999.

Other activities
Grossholtz was arrested as an anti-war protester over dates ranging from 1941 to 2014. She was one of several pacifists from the Pioneer Valley profiled in the 2005 documentary film The Peace Patriots.

Although she was unathletic until her 50s, when she was 65 she won a silver medal in bodybuilding in the 1994 Gay Games . Grossholtz died February 9, 2021.

Selected publications
Grossholtz's publications include:

References 

Pennsylvania State University alumni
University of Denver alumni
MIT School of Humanities, Arts, and Social Sciences alumni
Mount Holyoke College faculty
2021 deaths
Women's studies academics
1929 births
Place of birth missing
Place of death missing